Ulrich Plenzdorf (26 October 1934 – 9 August 2007) was a German author and dramatist.

Life
Born in Berlin, Plenzdorf studied Philosophy in Leipzig, but graduated with a degree in film. He found work at DEFA.

He became famous in both East and West Germany for his socially critical work titled "Die neuen Leiden des jungen W." Written in the jargon of the GDR-youth of the 1970s, it details the tragic story of a young man and his attempt to break free from his stifling middle class environment, drawing parallels between his own life and that of the protagonist in Goethe's work The Sorrows of Young Werther (Die Leiden des jungen Werther) (1774).

From 2004 to 2007, Plenzdorf was a guest lecturer at the Deutsches Literaturinstitut in Leipzig.

He died near Berlin of undisclosed causes, aged 72.

Awards and honors
1973 Heinrich-Mann-Preis
1978 Ingeborg-Bachmann-Preis

Works
Die neuen Leiden des jungen W.
Der alte Mann, das Pferd, die Straße (1974)
Buridans Esel (1976) (Drama based on the novel by Günter de Bruyn)
Auszug (1977)
kein runter kein fern (1978)
Legende vom Glück ohne Ende (1979) (extended novel based on the film Die Legende von Paul und Paula)
Gutenachtgeschichte (1980)
Ein Tag länger als ein Leben (1986)
Freiheitsberaubung (1987)
Eins und Eins ist Uneins

Screenwriter
 Follow Me, Scoundrels (dir. Ralf Kirsten, 1964) — based on a novel by 
  (dir. Herrmann Zschoche, 1965, released: 1990)
 Weite Straßen – stille Liebe (dir. Herrmann Zschoche, 1969) — based on a novel by 
  (dir. , 1971) — based on stories by Gisela Karau
 The Legend of Paul and Paula (dir. Heiner Carow, 1973)
  (dir. Herrmann Zschoche, 1974)
 Die neuen Leiden des jungen W. (dir. , 1976, TV film, West Germany)
  (dir. Herrmann Zschoche, 1980) — based on the novel Buridans Esel by Günter de Bruyn
 Es geht seinen Gang oder Mühen in unserer Ebene (dir. , 1981, TV film, West Germany) — based on a novel by Erich Loest
  (dir. Frank Beyer, 1981, TV film, West Germany) — based on a novel by 
  (dir. Herrmann Zschoche, 1983) — based on a novel by Benno Pludra
  (dir. Frank Beyer, 1984) — based on a novel by Christoph Meckel
  (dir. Peter Beauvais, 1986, TV film, West Germany) — based on a novella by Martin Walser
  (dir. Rainer Simon, 1991) — based on a story by Franz Fühmann
  (dir. Christian Steinke, 1991, TV film)
  (dir. Frank Beyer, 1991) — based on a story by Volker Braun
 Vater Mutter Mörderkind (dir. Heiner Carow, 1993, TV film)
 Liebling Kreuzberg (dir. , 1994, TV series, 13 episodes) — TV series created by Jurek Becker
 Das andere Leben des Herrn Kreins (dir. Andreas Dresen, 1994, TV film) — based on the play The Professional by Dušan Kovačević
  (dir. , 1995, TV film) — based on the novel The Drinker by Hans Fallada
  (dir. , 1995, TV film) — based on a novel by 
 Abgehauen (dir. Frank Beyer, 1998, TV film) — based on the autobiography of Manfred Krug
  (dir. Jo Baier, 1998, TV miniseries) — based on a novel by Erwin Strittmatter

Film adaptations
Nuoren Wertherin jäljillä, directed by Jarmo Lampela (2013, based on the novel Die neuen Leiden des jungen W.)

References

Der Spiegel obituary

1934 births
2007 deaths
Writers from Berlin
East German writers
German male dramatists and playwrights
20th-century German dramatists and playwrights
20th-century German male writers
Leipzig University alumni
Heinrich Mann Prize winners
Ingeborg Bachmann Prize winners
Recipients of the Heinrich Greif Prize